Taman ASEAN is a township in Melaka, Malaysia. This township is located at Lebuh AMJ between Cheng, Pokok Mangga and Malim Jaya.

Populated places in Malacca